Long Mỹ is a district-level town in the Mekong Delta of Vietnam. Until May 2015 it was a part of Long Mỹ District.

Districts of Hậu Giang province
County-level towns in Vietnam